Sacramento Knoxx is a hardworking interdisciplinary artist with strong roots in Detroit from the southwest side. He produces a sound of electronic, indigenous, ghettotech, afro-latino, hip hop, soul, and rhythm & blues.

Knoxx versatile background with different forms of music, allows him to blend traditional and contemporary styles creating dynamic storytelling experiences with live music performances, dancing, & video projections that take audiences on a participatory journey and a creative experience. Currently he shares interactive music performances, blending captured moments in life & creative imagery through large projection motion graphics. Building from raw experience and grit his works send vibrations to help assemble the worlds we want to live in.

References

External links 
 Knoxx's website

Ojibwe people
Living people
American male rappers
Native American rappers
Chicano rap
Year of birth missing (living people)
21st-century American rappers
21st-century American male musicians